Larry Dunn (born Lorenzo Russell Dunn; June 19, 1953) is an American keyboardist, musical director and one of the early members of the music group Earth, Wind & Fire. Dunn, along with other members of Earth, Wind & Fire, was inducted into the Rock & Roll Hall of Fame in 2000. They received a star on the Hollywood Walk of Fame in 1995, Lifetime Achievement honors from ASCAP (Rhythm & Soul Heritage Award, 2002, 4 American Music Awards, and are inductees of the Songwriter Hall of Fame. Dunn is a co-writer of the song "Shining Star", an Earth, Wind & Fire classic song that has been inducted into the Grammy Hall of Fame.

Career

Earth, Wind & Fire
Born as Lorenzo Dunn, he attended East High School in Denver, Colorado. During 1972, while in Los Angeles, Dunn joined a new band led and founded by a Chicago musician known as Maurice White by the name of Earth, Wind & Fire. As a keyboardist Dunn played with the legendary band for the next 11 years until his departure in 1983.

Dunn went on to make a guest appearance on EWF's 2013 album Now, Then & Forever.

Work with other artists
Dunn performed as a keyboardist on The Emotions' 1976 album Flowers and produced Caldera on their 1977 album Sky Islands. Sky Islands rose to No. 18 on the Cashbox Top Jazz Albums chart. He then played on Deniece Williams' 1977 album Song Bird, Dee Dee Bridgewater's 1977 LP Just Family and Ronnie Laws' 1977 album Friends & Strangers, and co-produced Ramsey Lewis' 1977 studio LP Tequila Mockingbird. Tequila Mockingbird peaked at No. 6 on the Billboard Top Jazz Albums chart. He also performed on the Emotions' 1977 album Rejoice, the Pockets's 1978 LP Take It On Up, Caldera's 1978 album Time and Chance, and Lenny White's 1978 album The Adventures of Astral Pirates. Dunn then produced White on his 1978 album Streamline. Streamline reached No. 27 on the Billboard Top Jazz Albums chart.

Dunn went on to play the keyboards on Ronnie Laws 1978 LP Flame, Hubert Laws 1979 LP Land of Passion and Dee Dee Bridgewater's 1979 album Bad for Me. He then co-produced with Lenny White Twennynine's 1979 LP Best of Friends. That album reached number 15 on the Billboard Top R&B Albums chart. Dunn again co-produced with Lenny White the group's 1980 album entitled Twennynine with Lenny White. That LP reached No. 22 on the Billboard Top R&B Albums chart.

Dunn went on to produce Lewis' 1980 album Routes. Routes reached No. 7 on the Billboard Top Jazz Albums chart. He then played on Ronnie Laws' 1980 LP Every Generation 
and his 1981 album Solid Ground. He later produced Stanley Turrentine's 1981 LP Tender Togetherness. That album got to No. 13 on the Billboard Jazz Albums chart. Dunn then performed on Ronnie Laws' 1983 album Mr. Nice Guy and Jennifer Holliday's 1983 LP Feel My Soul. He then co-produced Level 42's 1983 album Standing in the Light. Standing in the Light was certified Gold in the UK by the BPI.

Dunn later featured on Morris Day's 1985 album Color of Success and Ronnie Laws 1986 LP Mirror Town. He then appeared on Ramsey Lewis 1987 album Keys to the City and Ronnie Laws' 1989 LP True Spirit.

He later composed on Ronnie Laws' 1991 album Identity and his 1992 LP Deep Soul. Dunn also worked as an arranger on Laws' 1995 album Brotherhood. He then played on Dean James 1997 LP Intimacy and Reel Tight's 1999 album Back to the Real. Dunn also appeared on Ronnie Laws' 2000 LP Dream a Little and his 2004 album Everlasting.

Dunn later performed on Brian Culbertson's 2008 album Bringing Back The Funk, Raphael Saadiq's 2010 LP Stone Rollin' and Culbertson's 2014 album Another Long Night Out.

Discography

References

External links
Official Website

Larry Dunn at Allmusic.
Interview with Larry Dunn NAMM Oral History Library (2013)

American male organists
African-American pianists
American session musicians
Grammy Award winners
Living people
1953 births
Musicians from Denver
Earth, Wind & Fire members
21st-century organists
21st-century American keyboardists
20th-century American keyboardists
American organists